The men's 400 metres event at the 2002 Asian Athletics Championships was held in Colombo, Sri Lanka on 9–10 August.

Medalists

Results

Heats

Final

References

2002 Asian Athletics Championships
400 metres at the Asian Athletics Championships